The Académie Ranson was founded in Paris by the French painter Paul Ranson (1862–1909), who himself studied at the Académie Julian, in 1908.

History 
With the untimely death of Paul Ranson in 1909, the Academy was headed by the wife of its founder, Marie-France Ranson. It was first based in Rue Henri Monnier in the 9th arrondissement and then moved to the Montparnasse district, in the Rue Joseph Bara. Maurice Denis and Paul Sérusier delivered courses and Ker-Xavier Roussel, Félix Vallotton, and Édouard Vuillard also attended, which gave it a good reputation. Concetta, former model of Edgar Degas for Les repasseuses and Auguste Rodin for The Kiss, helped its reputation too. Students attended for periods from a week to a year.

In 1914, its teachers were depleted due to World War I, but the Académie Ranson survived despite declining attendance. After 1918, Maurice Denis and Paul Sérusier were occupied with other activities, and new teachers took over, many of them alumni: Yves Alix, Gustave Jaulmes, Paul Vera, Jules-Émile Zingg, Roger Bissière, Louis Latapie, Dimitrios Galanis, and Amédée de la Patellière.

In 1931, Marie-France Ranson handed over the management of the Academy to Harriet Von Tschudi Cérésole, a student and sculptor, originally from the Canton of Glarus in Switzerland. From 1939 to 1944, during World War II, the Academy remains open for a few students. It opened again in 1951 with new teachers, including Roger Chastel, Marcel Fiorini, Lucien Lautrec, Gustave Singier, and Henri Goetz, but due to lack of funds it finally closed in 1955.

See also
 Geoffrey Eastop, potter

Sources
 Académie Ranson, French Wikipedia.

References

External links
Paul Ranson

Art schools in Paris
Educational institutions established in 1908
Educational institutions disestablished in 1983
History of Paris
Defunct universities and colleges in France
Defunct art schools
1908 establishments in France
1983 disestablishments in Europe